Ram Bahadur Rai is a senior Hindi journalist. He is Former news editor of Hindi daily Jansatta. He has published and authored and edited several of books. He is known for some impressive biographies, written in Hindi, namely Shashwat Vidrohi Rajneta based on life and acts of Gandhian socialist Acharya J. B. Kripalani, Rahvari ke Sawal on Chandrashekhar and Manjil se Jyada Safar on V P Singh. He was a close associate of the Indian freedom fighter and political leader Jayaprakash Narayan and was also part of a Steering Committee of JP Movement.

Early life
He was born on 1 July 1946 in Bhumihar Brahmin family of Sofonari village in Ghazipur. He got his early education at his native place and nearby Machhti Inter College. For higher education he moved to Varanasi and completed his graduation from Banaras Hindu University. He got his postgraduate degree in economics from BHU. He obtained PG diploma in mass communication from Rajasthan University.

In the year 1965 on the behest of central government academic council of BHU proposed to drop 'Hindu' word from the name of the university. Ram Bahadur Rai led a student movement to oppose this move which was shelved after  rising protest. However Ram Bahadur Rai was expelled from the university for leading the protest. To continue as a regular student an apology was asked by the university administration but Rai refused. As a result, he couldn't complete his Ph.D. in economics.

Being the organising secretary of Akhil Bharatiya Vidyarthi Parishad Ram Bahadur Rai led the student movement during JP movement.

Career
Ram Bahadur Rai started his career as journalist with Hindustan Samachar. He wrote eyewitness account of Bangladesh Liberation War for Hindi Daily Aaj, published from Varanasi. Later on he moved to Delhi and started working journalist with Hindi daily Jansatta. At Jansatta he worked as Bureau Chief and News Editor. For a short span of time he worked as special correspondent for Navbharat Times also. At present he is working as group editor of Hindusthan Samachar.

In the year 2015 Government of India appointed Ram Bahadur Rai as the president of Indira Gandhi National Centre for the Arts (IGNCA) executive committee.

First person to be jailed during emergency
Rai was the first person to be jailed, in 1974, under the Maintenance of Internal Security Act,(MISA). This act was passed by the Indira Gandhi government in 1973, giving dictatorial powers to law enforcement agencies, and repealed by the subsequent Janata Party Government in 1977. He was again jailed for eighteen months.

Organiser of JP movement
Ram Bahadur Rai  served as one of the key member of the steering committee of JP movement. Rai played an important role during student movement of 1974. It was ARPAN KUMAR RAI under whose leadership students' leaders of many organisations met JP and requested him to lead the movement.

Position held and awards
 He was awarded Padma Shri, the fourth highest civilian award of India, in 2015.
 Patron, Integrated Talent Development Mission (ITDM)
 President of the 20 member board of Indira Gandhi National Centre for the Arts (IGNCA).
 Madhavrao Sapre National Journalism Award
 Manikchandra Vajpayi National Journalism Award
 Bhagwandas Journalism Award
 Satyagrahi Samman
 Jagadguru Ramanandacharya Award

See also
 Jayaprakash Narayan

References

Living people
People from Ghazipur
Indian male journalists
Hindi journalists
Indian editors
Indians imprisoned during the Emergency (India)
Recipients of the Padma Shri in literature & education
20th-century Indian journalists
Journalists from Uttar Pradesh
1946 births